Bezeréd is a village in Zala County in the south-western region of Hungary.

Etymology
The name comes from a Slavic personal name Bezradъ (bez: without, radъ: to be happy/happiness). 1236 casterenses de Bezered, 1359 the settlement Bezered.

References

External links
Official site
Megmenthető-e még a Bezerédj-Békássy kastély? (in Hungarian)

Populated places in Zala County